Clue may refer to:

People with the name
 DJ Clue (born 1975), mixtape DJ
 Arthur Clues (1924–1998), Australian rugby league footballer
 Ivan Clues
 Tim Cluess
 Tim Clue
 Oliver Clue

Arts, entertainment, and media

Clue entertainment franchise
 Cluedo (known as Clue in North America), a crime fiction board game, and derivative items:
 Clue (1992 video game), full title: Clue: Parker Brothers' Classic Detective Game
 Clue (1998 video game), full title: Clue: Murder at Boddy Mansion or Cluedo: Murder at Blackwell Grange
 Clue (book series),  series of 18 children's books published throughout the 1990s
 Clue (film), 1985 American ensemble mystery comedy film based on the board game.
 Clue (miniseries), five-part mystery television miniseries which aired on The Hub
 Clue (mobile games), two distinct adaptations of the board game for mobile devices
 Clue (musical), full title: Clue The Musical

Music
 Clues (band), from Montreal
 Clues (Clues album), 2009
 Clues (Robert Palmer album), 1980

Other uses in arts, entertainment, and media
 "Clues" (Star Trek: The Next Generation), a television episode
 I'm Sorry I Haven't a Clue, or Clue, a BBC radio comedy panel game
 The Clue, a 1915 American silent film

Science and technology 
 Clue (mobile app), a menstrual health app developed by BioWink GmbH
 Clue cell, a type of vaginal cell
 Cluster Exploratory, or CluE, a National Science Foundation-funded research program
 Comprehensive Loss Underwriting Exchange, a insurance claim tracking service

See also 
 Clew, part of a sail
 CLU (disambiguation)
 Evidence